The Catholic Church in Bangladesh is part of the worldwide Catholic Church, under the spiritual leadership of the pope in Rome. , there are approximately 350,000, approximately 0.2 percent of the population of Bangladesh.  About 60% of Catholics come from "tribals", members of minority tribes. Bangladesh is otherwise a predominantly Muslim country.

, the country is made up of eight dioceses including two archdioceses. There is one cardinal in Bangladesh, Patrick D'Rozario, the country's first ever cardinal.

The Catholic Bishops' Conference of Bangladesh, founded  in 1971, is the General Body of the Ordinaries of Bangladesh. The purpose of this Conference is to facilitate common policy and action in matters that affect or are liable to affect the interest of the Catholic Church in Bangladesh and to be of service to the country at large.  Pope John Paul II visited Dhaka in November 1986.

The U.S. State Department and human rights groups have cited Bangladesh as a nation of concern with regards to violence against religious minorities, including Hindus and Christians.  A notable incident of violence against Christians was a 2001 bomb attack on a Catholic church during Sunday Mass, killing nine and maiming dozens.  Since the rise of al-Qaida and ISIS, violence, threats and various forms of oppression against non-Muslims have increased in Bangladesh, and a 2014 State Department report noted insufficient government efforts to protect religious minorities. In January 2014, homes were set ablaze and eight Catholics were injured, allegedly for exercising their right to vote in the nation's parliamentary elections. In July 2014, a mob of 60 stormed a Catholic convent, where they proceeded to beat up nuns and a priest. In April 2015, a mob attacked churchgoers and stabbed a priest during Easter Mass. In December 2015, three adult siblings in a Catholic family were attacked while inside their home. Two of them were injured critically. In early February 2016, a group of 20 raided a church and a convent at night. Nuns were beaten and property was looted. In July 2016, nearly two dozen people were killed by gunman during an attack on a popular restaurant in Dhaka where Christians and other non-Muslims, mostly foreigners, were known to frequent.

In 1598, the first priest arrived in Bangladesh accompanying the Portuguese.

Pope Francis visited Bangladesh in November 2017.

Organisation
There are a total of 14 bishops in Bangladesh; 20 more have died. As head of the Archdiocese of Dhaka, Cardinal Patrick D'Rozario, CSC is the highest-ranked bishop in the country.

The Apostolic Nuncio, or papal ambassador, normally a Titular Archbishop, heads the Apostolic Nunciature (the Vatican's embassy), to Bangladesh. Since his appointment by Pope Francis on 6 July 2013, Archbishop George Kocherry has been the Apostolic Nuncio to Bangladesh.

Dioceses in Bangladesh 
Dioceses in Bangladesh:
 Archdiocese of Dhaka
 Diocese of Dinajpur
 Diocese of Mymensingh
 Diocese of Rajshahi
 Diocese of Sylhet
 Archdiocese of Chittagong
 Diocese of Barisal
 Diocese of Khulna

See also
 Catholic Church by country

References

External links
 Catholic Church in Bangladesh by GCatholic
 Profile of the Catholic Church in Bangladesh

 
Bangladesh
Bangladesh